Sidney Mark Fliegelman (May 30, 1933 – April 18, 2022), known professionally as Sid Mark, was an American radio disc jockey based in Philadelphia, Pennsylvania.  Mark was best known for hosting a weekly syndicated radio program featuring the music of singer Frank Sinatra, including commentary, interviews, trivia facts and other information to add color and context.

Early life
Mark was born on May 30, 1933, in Philadelphia. served two years in the United States Army, serving as an infantryman during the Korean War, and afterwards began hosting a live broadcast of a Saturday Jazz show at the Red Hill Inn in Pennsauken, New Jersey.

Career
Mark's shows included Sunday with Sinatra, airing 11 a.m. to 1 p.m. each Sunday on 1210 WPHT in Philadelphia, and The Sounds of Sinatra, which was syndicated nationally through the Westwood One radio network.  The first version of Mark's Sinatra shows was Friday with Frank, which began airing in 1957 over WHAT and WHAT-FM, where Mark was a disc jockey, and ran nearly continuously in Philadelphia until his death. The Broadcast Pioneers of Philadelphia inducted Mark into their Hall of Fame in 2001. Mark only missed one show, in 1999 for open heart surgery. The Pennsylvania Association of Broadcasters named Mark 'Broadcaster of the Year 2018" in May 2018.

Personal life and death
Mark married his wife Judy in 1973; they had a daughter, Stacey. Sid had three sons from a previous marriage, Andy, the oldest, Eric and Brian, who worked on Sid's radio program.

Mark died on April 18, 2022, in Bryn Mawr, Pennsylvania, at the age of 88.

References

External links
Sounds of Sinatra website
Broadcast Pioneers of Philadelphia website

1933 births
2022 deaths
American radio DJs
Military personnel from Philadelphia
Radio personalities from Philadelphia
United States Army personnel of the Korean War